Seney may refer to:

Places
In the United States:
 Seney, Iowa, an unincorporated community
 Seney Township, Michigan
 Seney, Michigan, an unincorporated community in Seney Township
 Seney, Missouri, an unincorporated community
 Seney National Wildlife Refuge, surrounding the community of Seney, MI
 Seney Stretch, a 25-mile straight route along M-28 between Seney and Shingleton, MI

People
 Brett Seney (1996-) Canadian ice hockey player in the National Hockey League
 George E. Seney (1832–1905), nineteenth century politician, lawyer and judge from Ohio
 Joshua Seney (1756–1798), American farmer, lawyer, and politician

Other uses
 The Seney Syndicate, which linked together several short railroads in Ohio, Indiana, and Illinois to form the Lake Erie and Western Railroad